John Peter Riggall (born 10 May 1941) is a former Australian politician. He served in the House of Representatives from 1990 to 1993, representing the Victorian seat of McMillan for the Liberal Party.

Early life
Riggall was born on 10 May 1941 in Melbourne, the son of Horton and Edna Riggall. Prior to entering politics he worked as a dairy farmer and grazier. He holds a diploma in rural studies from the McMillan Rural Studies Centre.

Politics
Before his election to parliament, Riggall served on the state council of the Liberal Party of Australia (Victorian Division) and was an officeholder in his local branch. He was elected to parliament at the 1990 federal election, defeating the incumbent Australian Labor Party (ALP) member Barry Cunningham in the Division of McMillan. In parliament Riggall served on the House Standing Committees on Aboriginal Affairs and Employment, Education and Training. Cunningham reclaimed McMillan for the Labor Party at the 1993 election.

Personal life
Riggall had three children with his wife June.

References

Liberal Party of Australia members of the Parliament of Australia
Members of the Australian House of Representatives for McMillan
Members of the Australian House of Representatives
1941 births
Living people
Politicians from Melbourne
20th-century Australian politicians
Australian farmers